Michele Jenkins Guyton (born October 19, 1966) is an American politician from the Democratic Party and is a member of the Maryland House of Delegates representing District 42B.

Background 
Guyton was born on October 19, 1966, in Madison, Tennessee. She attended Baldwin County High School in Bay Minette, Alabama and received her B.A. in psychology and anthropology from Vanderbilt University in 1989. She later attended Radcliffe College and Brandeis University to receive a joint M.A. in women's studies and psychology. Guyton also possesses a Ph.D. in developmental & social psychology from Brandeis, which she received in 1996.

In 2015, Governor Larry Hogan appointed Guyton to serve on the Maryland State Board of Education. The Maryland Senate approved her nomination in a 42-0 vote. She served on the board until January 1, 2019, when she resigned to become a state delegate.

In January 2018, at the Baltimore Women's March, Guyton announced her intent to run for state delegate, citing the 2016 presidential election as what motivated her to run for office. During the primary, she enjoyed endorsements from various organizations, including the Maryland League of Conservation Voters, Metro Baltimore Council AFL–CIO, NARAL Pro-Choice Maryland, and the LiUNA Mid-Atlantic Region, and state senator James Brochin. She received 48.4 percent of the vote in the 2022 Democratic primary and narrowly defeated Republican Tim Robinson in the general election with 26.5 percent of the vote. Mileah Kromer, a political scientist and pollster at Goucher College, suggested that Guyton's primary win indicated a polarized electorate in Maryland's 42nd district.

Guyton is a developmental psychologist and disabilities advocate who has worked at various institutions relating to psychology, including the University of Iowa, the North Carolina Department of Mental Health, and the Kennedy Krieger Institute. Her three sons all have disabilities, which moved her to co-found a support group for families with disabilities that has since evolved into the Mid-Atlantic chapter of the Tourette Association of America. She has also used her position as state delegate to introduce several pieces of legislation that would support disabled Marylanders.

In the legislature 
Guyton was sworn in as a member of the House of Delegates on January 9, 2019. She was floated as a potential candidate for Maryland Senate in 2022. Unopposed in the Democratic primary, Guyton was reelected in the 2022 general election by a more than 20% margin.

Committee assignments 
 Ways and Means Committee, 2019–present (education subcommittee, 2019–present; finance resources subcommittee, 2019; racing & gaming subcommittee, 2020; early childhood subcommittee, 2021–present)

Other memberships 
 Women's Legislators of Maryland, 2019–present
 Maryland Legislative Transit Caucus, 2019–present
 Maryland Legislative Latino Caucus, 2019–2020

Political positions 
Guyton is a self-described progressive Democrat, but has expressed that she will work across the aisle to support good ideas "regardless of who is sponsoring them."

Education 
Guyton supports universal pre-kindergarten, boosting mental health supports in schools and improving teacher-student ratios in classrooms.

Guns 
In February 2020, Guyton joined seven Democratic delegates in voting against a bill that would mandate background checks on private sales and transfers of shotguns and rifles.

Healthcare 
Guyton supports expanding access to healthcare, saying that she "believes it really is a human right" and that single-payer healthcare is worth discussing but would have to be paid for.

Minimum wage 
On the campaign trail, Guyton advocated for the legislature to pass a "$15 an hour living wage with future indexed increases." In March 2019, she was one of two Democrats in the Maryland House of Delegates to vote against a bill that would raise the minimum wage to $15 an hour.

Taxes 
Guyton opposes raising new taxes, instead advocating for redirecting priorities and using funding sources like lottery money and the legalization of marijuana.

Electoral history

References

Democratic Party members of the Maryland House of Delegates
Women state legislators in Maryland
Vanderbilt University alumni
Brandeis University alumni
Living people
1966 births
21st-century American politicians
21st-century American women politicians